Adelchi is an 1822 play. It may refer to:

 Adelchi (Carmelo Bene), a 1984 play by Carmelo Bene
 Adelchi Negri (died 1912), Italian pathologist

See also
Adelchis (given name), people with the given name